Metalcore (also known as metallic hardcore) is a fusion music genre that combines elements of extreme metal and hardcore punk. As with other styles blending metal and hardcore, such as crust punk and grindcore, metalcore is noted for its use of breakdowns, slow, intense passages conducive to moshing. Other defining instrumental qualities include heavy riffs and stop-start rhythm guitar playing, occasional blast beats, and double bass drumming. Vocalists in the genre typically use thrash or scream vocals. Some later metalcore bands combine this with clean singing, often during the chorus. Death growls and gang vocals are common. 1990s metalcore bands were inspired by hardcore while later metalcore bands were inspired by melodic death metal bands like At the Gates and In Flames.

The roots of metalcore are in the 1980s when bands would combine hardcore punk with heavy metal. This included New York hardcore bands like Agnostic Front, Cro-Mags, and Killing Time, British hardcore punk bands like the Exploited and Discharge, and American crossover thrash bands like Dirty Rotten Imbeciles and Suicidal Tendencies. The genre emerged in the early 1990s and expanded in the mid–late 1990s. Metalcore bands like Integrity, Earth Crisis, Hatebreed, Converge, Shai Hulud, Vision of Disorder, Merauder, and Disembodied emerged and acquired underground success in the 1990s.

In the mid-2000s, metalcore became one of the most popular heavy metal subgenres with the success of bands like Bleeding Through, Avenged Sevenfold, Killswitch Engage, Hatebreed, Atreyu, Shadows Fall, As I Lay Dying, Unearth, Trivium, Bullet for My Valentine, and All That Remains. Metalcore's popularity continued in the 2010s with the success of bands like Asking Alexandria, August Burns Red, and the Devil Wears Prada. Metalcore subgenres like deathcore, easycore and electronicore also emerged in the 2000s decade. Other subgenres of metalcore include mathcore, nu metalcore, melodic metalcore and progressive metalcore.

Characteristics

Metalcore is known for its use of breakdowns, in which it was preceded by beatdown hardcore. Metalcore singers typically perform screaming, a vocal technique developed in the 1980s and characteristic of 1990s metalcore. Later metalcore bands often combine this with the use of standard singing, usually during the bridge or chorus of a song. The death growl technique is also popular.

The instrumentation of metalcore includes heavy guitar riffs often utilizing percussive pedal tones, stop-start rhythm guitar, double bass drumming, and breakdowns. Drop guitar tunings are often used. Most bands use tuning ranging between Drop D and A, although lower tunings, as well as 7 and 8 string guitars, are not uncommon. Drummers typically use a lot of double bass technique and general drumming styles across the board. Blast beats are also heard at times. According to author James Giordano, "tempos in metalcore tend to be slower than those found in thrash metal". Many later metalcore bands would include guitar solos in songs.

1990s metalcore bands generally had a strong influence from heavy hardcore. In the 2000s, metalcore bands began to be exclusively inspired by heavy metal. Many 2000s metalcore bands were heavily inspired by melodic death metal and used strong elements of melodic death metal in their music. Malcolm Dome of Revolver wrote that without melodic death metal band At the Gates' 1995 album Slaughter of the Soul, "modern American metalcore (everyone from As I Lay Dying and Killswitch Engage to All That Remains and the Black Dahlia Murder) wouldn't even exist." Graham Hartmann of Loudwire wrote "Although metalcore broke in the early 2000s, listening to At the Gates' 1995 album feels like a Nostradamus-esque prediction of how metal would evolve."

History

Precursors: 1980s

Black Flag and Bad Brains, among the originators of hardcore punk, admired and emulated Black Sabbath. British hardcore punk groups such as Discharge and the Exploited also took inspiration from heavy metal. The Misfits put out the Earth A.D. album, becoming a crucial influence on thrash metal. Nonetheless, punk and metal cultures and music remained fairly separate through the first half of the 1980s. Cross-pollination between metal and hardcore eventually birthed the crossover thrash scene, which gestated at a Berkeley club called Ruthie's, in 1984. The term "metalcore" was originally used to refer to these crossover groups.

Hardcore punk groups Corrosion of Conformity, D.R.I. and Suicidal Tendencies played alongside thrash metal groups like Metallica and Slayer. This scene influenced the skinhead wing of New York hardcore, which also began in 1984, and included groups such as Cro-Mags, Murphy's Law, Agnostic Front and Warzone. The Cro-Mags were among the most influential of these bands, drawing equally from Bad Brains, Motörhead and Black Sabbath. Cro-Mags also embraced some aspects of straight edge and Krishna consciousness. Another New York metal-influenced straight edge group of this time period is the Crumbsuckers. The year 1985 saw the development of the hardcore breakdown, an amalgamation of Bad Brains' reggae and metal backgrounds, which encouraged moshing. Agnostic Front's 1986 album Cause for Alarm showed a combination of hardcore punk with heavy metal influences.

Origins: 1990s

Between 1993 and 1995, a wave of metallic hardcore bands emerged, including Integrity, Earth Crisis, Converge, Focal Point, Strongarm, Shai Hulud, Judge, Strife, Rorschach, Vision of Disorder Hatebreed, Zao, and Disembodied.

Integrity drew influence from the hardcore band G.I.S.M. and the thrash metal band Slayer, with others like Septic Death, Samhain, Motörhead and Joy Division. Earth Crisis and Hatebreed borrowed from hardcore punk and took influence from death metal. Earth Crisis's albums Firestorm, Destroy the Machines and Gomorrah's Season Ends were early examples of metalcore, as was Vision of Disorder's self-titled full-length debut in 1996. Coalesce and Overcast were also important early metalcore groups. Journalist Lars Gotrich wrote, "Along with key records by The Dillinger Escape Plan and Botch, Give Them Rope (1997) is an underground milestone that helped [further] what was soon [universally] called 'metalcore'. At the risk of sounding too reductive—metalcore was the natural progression where extreme metal and hardcore met, but with spiraling time signatures that somehow felt more aggressive." Shai Hulud's 1997 album Hearts Once Nourished with Hope and Compassion became especially influential in the latter part of the decade. Hatebreed released their debut album Satisfaction is the Death of Desire in 1997. The album helped the band achieve underground success, selling 158,000 copies, according to Nielsen SoundScan.

Mainstream success: 2000s 

The early 2000s included a wave of metalcore bands who placed significantly greater emphasis on melody. Melodic metalcore bands include Killswitch Engage, Avenged Sevenfold, As I Lay Dying, Trivium, Dead by April, All That Remains, Atreyu, Bullet for My Valentine, Bury Tomorrow, Darkest Hour, Shadows Fall, and August Burns Red. These groups took major influence, cues, and writing styles from Swedish melodic death metal bands, particularly At the Gates, In Flames, Arch Enemy and Soilwork. Melodic metalcore often employs clean vocals.

In the early 2000s, metalcore started to gain more prominence, with several independent metal labels, including Century Media, Metal Blade and Roadrunner Records, signing metalcore bands. Hatebreed released their second album Perseverance in 2002. The album sold 234,000 copies in the United States. Hatebreed's 2003 album The Rise of Brutality and 2006 album Supremacy peaked at numbers 30 and 31 on the Billboard 200, respectively. A new subgenre, melodic metalcore, strongly influenced by Swedish melodic death metal, has formed and quickly came to the forefront of metalcore's rise to popularity. In 2002, Killswitch Engage's Alive or Just Breathing reached number 37 on the Heatseekers Albums chart. In 2004, Killswitch Engage's The End of Heartache, Shadows Fall's The War Within, and Atreyu's The Curse peaked at numbers 21, 20, and 36 on the Billboard 200, respectively. Also, in 2006, Atreyu's third studio album, A Death-Grip On Yesterday peaked at number 9 on the Billboard 200, only to be followed up by 2007's Lead Sails Paper Anchor, which peaked at number 8. Atreyu's 2002 debut album Suicide Notes and Butterfly Kisses, as of July 3, 2004, has sold 107,000 copies in the United States. Killswitch Engage's 2004 album The End of Heartache and 2006 album As Daylight Dies were both certified gold by the Recording Industry Association of America (RIAA) in 2007 and 2009, respectively. Killswitch Engage's 2002 album Alive or Just Breathing, as of July 3, 2004, has sold 114,000 copies in the United States. Unearth began to have success among heavy metal fans in 2004 with the release of their second album The Oncoming Storm, which peaked at number 1 on the Heatseekers Albums chart on July 17, 2004. On that same day, the album peaked at number 105 on the Billboard 200. Unearth's 2006 album III: In the Eyes of Fire peaked at number 35 on the Billboard 200. The band's 2008 album The March peaked at number 45 on the Billboard 200. Oncoming Storm, III: In the Eyes of Fire''', and The March peaked at numbers 6, 2 and 3 on the Independent Albums chart, respectively. Avenged Sevenfold's first two albums Sounding the Seventh Trumpet (2001) and Waking the Fallen (2003) were both metalcore albums. On the band's 2005 album City of Evil, Avenged Sevenfold moved away from metalcore and changed to a traditional heavy metal sound. On June 15, 2005, Blabbermouth.net reported that Waking the Fallen has sold 172,253 copies in the United States, according to Nielsen SoundScan. On July 17, 2009, Waking the Fallen was certified gold by the RIAA.

Metalcore band As I Lay Dying also achieved success among heavy metal fans. The band's 2005 album Shadows Are Security peaked at number 35 on the Billboard 200 and sold 263,000 copies, according to Nielsen SoundScan. As I Lay Dying's 2007 album An Ocean Between Us peaked at number 8 on the Billboard 200 in 2007. As of April 2005, As I Lay Dying's 2003 album Frail Words Collapse sold 118,000 copies in the United States. All That Remains achieved success with their 2006 album The Fall of Ideals, which, as of October 1, 2008, sold 175,000 copies in the United States. All That Remains' 2008 album Overcome peaked at number 16 on the Billboard 200. Overcome song "Two Weeks" peaked at number 9 on the Mainstream Rock Songs chart on May 16, 2009. Bullet for My Valentine's debut album The Poison was released in October 2005 in Europe and was released in February 2006 in the United States. On July 26, 2006, Blabbermouth.net reported that The Poison has sold 72,000 copies in the United States. On October 27, 2007, Blabbermouth.net reported that The Poison has sold 336,000 copies in the United States. On April 3, 2010, Billboard reported that The Poison sold 573,000 copies in the United States. The Poison was certified gold by the RIAA on January 30, 2009. Bullet for My Valentine's second album Scream Aim Fire, released in 2008, peaked at number 4 on the Billboard 200 and sold 360,000 copies in the United States. Bullet for My Valentine's 2010 album Fever peaked at number 3 on the Billboard 200, selling 71,000 copies in the United States during its first week of release. Fever song "Your Betrayal" peaked at number 25 on the Bubbling Under Hot 100 chart. Trivium also achieved success among heavy metal fans when their 2005 album Ascendancy peaked at number 151 on the Billboard 200. Their albums The Crusade (2006) and Shogun (2008) peaked at numbers 25 and 23 on the Billboard 200, respectively. Bleeding Through's 2006 album The Truth peaked at number 1 on the Independent Albums chart on January 28, 2006. On that same day, the album peaked at number 48 on the Billboard 200.

 Rise of deathcore: mid–late 2000s 

Deathcore is a fusion of metalcore and death metal. Deathcore is defined by breakdowns, blast beats and death metal riffs. Bands may also incorporate guitar solos and even riffs that are influenced by metalcore. New York-based death metal group Suffocation is credited as one of the main influences for the emergence of deathcore. Embodyments album "Embrace The Eternal" is a foundation for the modern Deathcore sound. Some examples of deathcore bands are Suicide Silence, Whitechapel, Knights of the Abyss, Carnifex, Chelsea Grin and Impending Doom.

In 2006 and 2007 a wave of metalcore bands strongly influenced by death metal dubbed deathcore gained moderate popularity. Notable bands that brought the genre to the fore include Bring Me the Horizon and Suicide Silence. Suicide Silence's No Time to Bleed peaked at number 32 on the Billboard 200, number 12 on the Rock Albums Chart and number 6 on the Hard Rock Albums Chart, while their album The Black Crown peaked at number 28 on the Billboard 200, number 7 on the Rock Albums Chart and number 3 on the Hard Rock Albums Chart. After its release, Whitechapel's album This Is Exile sold 5,900 in copies, which made it enter the Billboard 200 chart at position 118. Their self-titled album peaked at number 65 on the Canadian Albums Chart and also at number 47 on the Billboard 200. Their third album A New Era of Corruption sold about 10,600 copies in the United States in its first week of being released and peaked at position number 43 on the Billboard 200 chart. Furthermore, Bring Me the Horizon won the 2006 Kerrang! Awards for Best British Newcomer after they released their 2006 debut record Count Your Blessings. However, Bring Me the Horizon abandoned the deathcore genre after the release of this album. San Diego natives Carnifex, witnessed success with their first album Dead in My Arms, selling 5,000 copies with little publicity. On top of their non-stop touring and methodical songwriting resulted in Carnifex quickly getting signed to label Victory Records. Lastly, Australian deathcore band Thy Art Is Murder debuted at number 35 on the ARIA Charts with their album Hate (2012) making them the first extreme metal band to ever reach the Top 40 of this chart.

 Continued success and sub genres: (2010s–present) 
By the early 2010s, metalcore was evolving to more frequently incorporate synthesizers and elements from genres beyond rock and metal. Many other metalcore bands emerged and achieved a lot of success. The Devil Wears Prada's 2011 album Dead Throne (which sold 32,400 in its first week) reached number 10 on the Billboard 200 chart. Asking Alexandria also achieved success, with their 2009 signature song "Final Episode (Let's Change the Channel)" being certified gold by the RIAA. The band's 2011 album Reckless & Relentless peaked at number 9 on the Billboard 200. Other metalcore bands achieving success in the early and mid-2010s include Motionless in White, Blessthefall, The Amity Affliction, and August Burns Red.

In 2018, an article in Kerrang! referred to a revival of an earlier style of metalcore, described as "a dark, powerful combination of hardcore’s honest fury and thrash’s cutthroat riffage", citing Vein, Vatican, Thirty Nights of Violence, and Chamber as the frontrunners of the style. The Odyssey also referred to Code Orange, Knocked Loose, Varials, Jesus Piece, Counterparts, Employed to Serve and Kublai Khan as groups gaining significant success within the genre. Knocked Loose released their 2019 sophomore effort A Different Shade of Blue to critical and commercial success. Code Orange also saw critical acclaim and success with their Roadrunner Records debut Forever in 2017. Forever's title track was also nominated Grammy for Best Metal Performance in 2018.

 Nu metalcore 

Nu metalcore is the musical fusion of nu metal and metalcore originating in the 2010s. Many notable groups take influence from deathcore, R&B, post-hardcore and industrial metal. Metalcore and deathcore groups such as Emmure, Of Mice & Men, Suicide Silence (The Black Crown album), and Issues all gained moderate popularity drawing influence from nu metal and metalcore.

 Progressive metalcore 

	
Progressive metalcore is a fusion of progressive metal and metalcore characterized by highly technical lead guitar and djent-influenced breakdowns. Practitioners of the genre often rely heavily on "atmospheric" elements and complex instrumentation.

 Electronicore 

Sumerian Records noted in the late 2000s that "there has been a surplus of electronica/hardcore music as of late." Attack Attack! is often recognized as the primary American contributor of the style, being inspired by British band Enter Shikari. Enter Shikari is an electronicore band that began in 1999, adding their last member and transforming to "Enter Shikari" from "Hybryd" in early 2003,  in St Albans, England. The group has received international radio airplay and a substantial number of musical awards, from Kerrang!, NME, Rock Sound Magazine and BT Digital Music Awards. They express a relationship with electronic music genres such as trance and have been referred to as the "kings of trancecore." Their second album, titled Common Dreads, was released in June 2009 and debuted on the UK Albums Chart at 16. In 2020, metal band Bring Me The Horizon released a Commercial Album Post Human: Survival Horror which has notable elements of Electronicore in a few tracks such as 1x1 which features duo Nova Twins.

 Revival scene 
In the early-2020s, a number of bands gained prominence in the scene that revived the sound of groups from the mid-to-late-2000s, fronted by Static Dress, SeeYouSpaceCowboy, If I Die First and CrazyEightyEight. This movement grew out of both the hardcore scene and the mainstream success that the emo rap scene gained the late-2010s.

See also

 List of metalcore bands

References

Bibliography
 Haenfler, Ross. Straight Edge: Clean-living Youth, Hardcore Punk, and Social Change, Rutgers University Press. .
 Mudrian, Albert (2000). Choosing Death: The Improbable History of Death Metal and Grindcore. Feral House. .
 Sharpe-Young, Garry (2005). New Wave of American Heavy Metal''. Zonda Books. .
 

 
Extreme metal
Fusion music genres
Hardcore punk genres
Heavy metal genres
1990s in music
2000s in music
2010s in music
20th-century music genres
21st-century music genres